Bibei is a town in Ruyuan Yao Autonomous County, Guangdong, China.

Administrative division
As of 2016, the town is divided into one community and seven villages: 
 Bibeikou Community
 Bibei
 Guikeng
 Gongkeng
 Wangcha
 Bankeng
 Hengxi
 Fangdong

History
It was formed as a township in 1957. In 1986, it was upgraded to a town. In 2005, the village of Fangdong came under the jurisdiction of the town.

Geography
The town sits at the northern Ruyuan Yao Autonomous County. The town shares a border with Daqiao Town to the west, Guitou Town to the east, Lechang to the north, and the towns of Dongping and Youxi to the south.

The Hengxi Reservoir is located in the town.

The Yangxi River flows west to east through the town.

Economy
The economy of the province is largest based on agriculture and local industry.

Demographics

As of 2017, the National Bureau of Statistics of China estimates the township's population now to be 7,737.

Transportation
The County Road X325 winds through the town.

References

Bibliography

 

Divisions of Ruyuan Yao Autonomous County
Towns in China